Thomas Spinks  (26 September 1819 – 14 January 1899) was an English first-class cricketer and barrister.

The son of William Spinks, he was born at Westminster in September 1819. He was educated at the Merchant Taylors' School, before going up to St John's College, Oxford. While studying at Oxford, he made a single appearance in first-class cricket for Oxford University against Cambridge University in The University Match of 1840. Batting twice in the match, he was dismissed without scoring win both Oxford innings' by Edward Sayres and William de St Croix respectively. With the ball, he took the wickets of William Pickering, de St Croix and Sayres in the Cambridge first-innings.

After graduating from Oxford, he became an advocate of the Doctors' Commons in 1849, until a motion for its disestablishment in January 1858. Becoming a member of the Inner Temple, he was called to the bar in November 1858. He was appointed Queen's Counsel in December 1866 and became a bencher the following year. By 1880, he was the registrar of York district probate registry. Spinks died at his home at Upper Sydenham in January 1899.

References

External links

1819 births
1899 deaths
People from Westminster
People educated at Merchant Taylors' School, Northwood
Alumni of St John's College, Oxford
English cricketers
Oxford University cricketers
Members of Doctors' Commons
Members of the Inner Temple
English barristers
English King's Counsel
19th-century English lawyers